Hypsibarbus salweenensis is a species of ray-finned fish in the genus Hypsibarbus which is endemic to the Salween River system in Myanmar and Thailand.

References

External links 
 

Salweenensis
Fish of Thailand
Fish described in 1996